"The Night Is Still Young" is a single by rock singer Billy Joel released as a new song from his compilation album Greatest Hits – Volume I & Volume II. It is the second of two new songs on the album, the first being "You're Only Human (Second Wind)." "The Night Is Still Young" peaked at No. 34 on the Billboard Hot 100.

Reception
Cash Box said it has "an aurally impressive arrangement and a triumphant chorus hook."  Billboard said it has a "brooding atmosphere and offbeat structure" that makes it different from many of Joel's other hits.

Music video
The video for the song mainly features the story of a man who has gone on a business trip, leaving his wife behind. This correlates with the song's lyrics, which speak of a man whose priorities are shifting away from his musical career and toward marriage and family.

The music video was directed by Neil Tardio.

Personnel 
Billy Joel – lead vocals, keyboards, harmonica
John McCurry – guitar
Doug Stegmeyer – bass guitar
Liberty DeVitto – drums
Jimmy Bralower – percussion
David Lebolt – synthesizers

Charts

A live version of the song appears on 12 Gardens Live.

References 

1985 songs
1985 singles
Billy Joel songs
Songs written by Billy Joel
Song recordings produced by Phil Ramone
Columbia Records singles